Mehnaz Begum (1958 – 19 January 2013) was a Pakistani TV, radio, and film singer. She was well known as a film playback singer in the 1970s and 1980s. She was the recipient of Nigar Awards.

Early life and career
Mehnaz Begum was born at Mahmudabad, Uttar Pradesh, India in 1958. Her family migrated to Pakistan in the late 1950s. She received her initial training in music from her mother Kajjan Begum who was also a singer.

She started her career as a playback singer in the early 1970s. Saleem Gilani, the director general of Radio Pakistan, Karachi first spotted her doing a concert at her college and helped her. Mehdi Hassan and his elder brother Pandit Ghulam Qadir trained her at this radio station for about a month. Her melodious voice, musical training and control over her voice made her popular among the Pakistani film music directors.

She sang a variety of genres but specialized in ghazal, thumri, dadra, khayal, drupad and reciting salam, noha and marsiya. She was the daughter of celebrated sub-continental singer Kajjan Begum. and the famous government officer Abdullah Abdullah Tasnim, but when she realized fame, she changed her name to simply Mehnaz or Mehnaz Begum. She also sang ghazals and light classical music for Pakistani television shows

Mehnaz Begum never married but some of her favorite hobbies included bird-watching and admiring nature. Her favorite television show and movie was Franklin (TV series) (life of a turtle by the name Franklin) and Bambi (1942 animated movie by Disney Studios). Mehnaz Begum loved to paint in her college days and wanted to choose painting as her career. She also delighted in drawing various flowers and birds.

Popular songs

Death
She died on 19 January 2013 at a Bahrain hospital while transiting from Karachi to Miami, Florida for medical treatment of a respiratory ailment. Her condition worsened during the flight and during a stopover at the Bahrain airport, she was taken to a hospital where she died. Mehnaz was laid to rest at Wadi-e-Hussain graveyard in Sohrab Goth Karachi.

Awards and recognition
 She had won the Nigar Award for Best Female Playback Singer 13 times
 Lifetime Achievement Award by Lux Style Awards (2011)

Television
 Wafa (Serial) 1999
 Mahnoor (Film) 2004

References

External links

1958 births
2013 deaths
Pakistani ghazal singers
Nigar Award winners
Pakistani playback singers
Singers from Karachi
Women ghazal singers
20th-century Pakistani women singers